Col. Edmund Quincy II (1628–1698) was an American Massachusetts Colonist, soldier, planter, politician, and merchant. He emigrated to colonial Massachusetts in 1633 with his father, Col. Edmund Quincy I (1602-1636).

Early life
Edmund Quincy II was born in England in 1628. He was the son of Col. Edmund Quincy I (1602-1636). In 1633, at around 5 years old, he emigrated to colonial Massachusetts with his father.

Career
Edmund was magistrate, representative to the general court and a Lt. Colonel in a Massachusetts militia regiment. In 1689 was a member of the provisional government (Committee of Safety). This was a time of turmoil in the colonies and England.  The disliked Governor Edmund Andros of the Dominion of New England was placed under investigation by the Committee, while in England the Glorious Revolution (James II fled to France) and the Bill of Rights brought fundamental changes to the political structure. Colonel Quincy started work in on the family property, called the Quincy Homestead, around 1696.

Personal life
His mother Judith Pares Quincy then married Robert Hull; John Hull's father. John and Edmund were step-brothers as well as in-laws.  John and Judith Quincy Hull raised Daniel Quincy from the age of seven.

His first wife was Joanna Hoar, sister of Leonard Hoar (President of Harvard College); and they had 10 children:
Daniel Quincy (7 Dec 1650-1690) married Anna Shepard. Ancestors of Presidents John Adams and John Quincy Adams; 
John Quincy (5 Feb 1652-died young); 
Mary Quincy (4 Jan 1654-1676) married c 1670 to Ephraim Savage. Other sources give the year 1649 for her birth year.;
Johanna/Joanna Quincy (16 Feb 1654-18 May 1695) married David Hobart;  
Judeth Quincy (25 April 1655 – 8 May 1679) married Rev. John Raynor, Jr.;  
Elizabeth Quincy (28 July 1656-?) married 1681 Rev. John Daniel Gookin.;  
Edmond Quincy (9 May 1657-died age 4 months);
Ruth Quincy (29 Oct 1658-?) married 19 Oct 1686 John Hunt.; 
Ann Quincy (3 September 1663 – 1676); 
Experience Quincy married William Saul.; 
. 
Edmund and his second wife, Elizabeth, the widow of Rev. John Elliot of Newton and daughter of Major General Daniel Gookin, had 2 children. 
Edmund Quincy (1681-1737) III was very active in colonial affairs, like his father.; His son was Col. Josiah Quincy I.
Mary Quincy (c1684-29 March 1716) married Rev. Daniel Baker, of Shirborne.; 
His grave was once marked with two granite columns embossed with lead. The lead was stripped for use by the colonists during the Revolution. This was noted by President John Adams.

Descendants
Many of Edmund's descendants were active in the American Revolution, some of the more notable being John Quincy Adams and Dorothy Quincy. The family intermarried with other local South Shore families, especially with the Hobarts of nearby Hingham.

Notes and references

See also 

 Quincy political family

People of colonial Massachusetts
Members of the colonial Massachusetts House of Representatives
Politicians from Quincy, Massachusetts
1628 births
1698 deaths
Kingdom of England emigrants to Massachusetts Bay Colony
Colonial American merchants
American planters